John J. Allen (August 2, 1871 – June 7, 1935) was mayor of Ottawa, Ontario, Canada, from 1931 to 1933.

He was born in Dungannon in Huron County, Ontario in 1871. In 1900, he came to Ottawa and opened a drug store; eventually, he and his partner, William Cochrane, sold their business to United Drug Stores, later Rexall. Allen and Cochrane later established a brokerage firm. He served as president of the Rotary Club in the city and later served as district governor. During Allen's term as mayor, he initiated repairs of the city sewer system which helped generate employment during the Great Depression.

Allen died of a heart attack in Montreal in 1935 and was buried in the Beechwood Cemetery.

References 
Chain of Office: Biographical Sketches of the Early Mayors of Ottawa (1847-1948), Dave Mullington

Mayors of Ottawa
People from Huron County, Ontario
1871 births
1935 deaths